Quick Change is a 2013 Philippine drama film directed by Eduardo Roy Jr. The film was screened in the Panorama section of the 64th Berlin International Film Festival.

Cast
 Mimi Juareza
 Jun Jun Quintana
 Miggs Cuaderno
 Francine Garcia
 Natashia Yumi
 Filipe Martinez
 Rolando Inocencio
 Sashi Giggle

References

External links
 

2013 films
2013 drama films
Philippine drama films
2010s Tagalog-language films
Philippine LGBT-related films
2013 LGBT-related films
LGBT-related drama films
Transgender-related films
Films directed by Eduardo Roy Jr.